Jacques Salze (born April 20, 1987) is a retired French professional footballer. He most recently played in Ligue 2 for US Quevilly, having played most of his career with Clermont in that division. After retirement at the end of the 2017–18 season, he trained as a referee with Clermont.

References

External links
 
 

1987 births
Living people
French footballers
Ligue 2 players
AS Cannes players
US Créteil-Lusitanos players
Clermont Foot players
Association football defenders